Frederick W. Raymond Wood (born c. 1900) was a footballer who played as a goalkeeper for Millwall Athletic and Charlton Athletic in the Football League. He also played for Clapton and Crystal Palace, before joining Grays Thurrock United in 1925.

References

Footballers from Bromley
English footballers
Tufnell Park F.C. players
Clapton F.C. players
Crystal Palace F.C. players
Millwall F.C. players
Charlton Athletic F.C. players
Grays Thurrock United F.C. players
Bostall Heath F.C. players
English Football League players
Year of death missing
Year of birth uncertain
Association football goalkeepers